Meijersplein / Airport is a metro station, as a part of the Rotterdam metro and the regional light rail system RandstadRail, located in Schiebroek, a borough of Rotterdam, the Netherlands.

History
Construction of Meijersplein station began in January 2008. Wilgenplas was served by railway trains on the Hofplein line before that line was converted for use by metro trains and the station was temporarily kept in service after this conversion took place in 2006.

In May 2010 construction of Meijersplein station completed and Wilgenplas station was duly closed down on 12 May. Meijersplein station was opened on 17 May and it is now being served by metro trains of line E. It has an Airport Shuttle service to and from Rotterdam The Hague Airport.

Train services
The station is served by the following service(s):

RandstadRail Line E Den Haag Centraal - Voorburg - Leidscheveen - Pijnacker - Meijersplein - Rotterdam Centraal - Beurs - Zuidplein - Slinge

Bus services

33 (RET) Meijersplein - Rotterdam-The Hague Airport - Overschie - Rotterdam Centraal''

Railway stations opened in 2010
RandstadRail stations in Rotterdam
Airport railway stations